Solsonès is a comarca (county) in Catalonia, Spain. It is part of historic county of Urgell. Over 60% of its people live in the capital, Solsona.

Municipalities

References

External links 
Official website 
Official tourism website 

 
Comarques of the Province of Lleida